That Was the Hour is a novel by F. J. Thwaites.

References

External links
That Was the Hour at AustLit

1956 Australian novels